The Battle of Kaipiais took place on July 15, 1789 during Russo-Swedish War (1788–90), between Sweden and the Russian Empire. The Swedes lost the battle and had to withdraw with a loss of 265 men.

References

 Mankell, J.: Finska Armeens och Finlands Krigshistoria

Kaipiais
1789 in Europe
Kaipiais
Kaipiais
Kaipiais
History of Kymenlaakso